Eocetus is an extinct protocetid early whale known from the early late Eocene (Bartonian) Giushi Formation in Gebel Mokattam, (paleocoordinates ) outside Cairo, Egypt. The specimen was first named by Fraas as Mesocetus schweinfurthi. However, the name Mesocetus was previously used causing a change to the species name to Eocetus schweinfurthi. Since the genus was first described in the early 20th century, several other specimens, mostly isolated vertebrae, have been attributed to Eocetus, but the taxonomic status of these widely distributed specimens remain disputed.

Discovery and taxonomy
 described "Mesocetus schweinfurthi" based on a dorsoventrally compressed skull with only I2 in situ, a specimen supposedly originating from a 40 Ma Tethyan deposit at Mokattam. Fraas also referred two isolated teeth, P4 and M1, to the skull and the most important of his specimens is not the deformed skull, but the upper molar which retains three roots and a worn but well-developed protocone. Georg August Schweinfurth, a German palaeontologist who explored Mokattam in the 1880s, mentioned the quarriers there very eagerly offered "shark teeth" to tourists and that scientists and fossil collectors regularly bought their specimens from this source. There is reason to assume that Fraas were among them and that at least his two isolated teeth were described without direct knowledge of their original locality and stratigraphic context. Notwithstanding that the stratigraphic information supplied by Fraas and his contemporaries can be difficult to interpret, the geology of Egypt is well-studied, and both the skull and the accompanying teeth are most likely Bartonian in age – older and significantly more primitive than any other cetacean specimen known from Egypt at that time. Fraas soon discovered that the name "Mesocetus" was already occupied, and changed the name of his "Urform Protocetus" to Eocetus.

Fraas also attributed two isolated vertebrae to his new genus, both of which  moved to Basilosaurus drazindai. A holotype, described by Stromer 1903 as Zeuglodon macrospondylus, was discovered in Egypt. It is later used for comparison for other vertebrae.  attributed two other vertebrae from Mokattam to Eocetus. These two vertebrae were lost for many years until  described two bones that he discovered in a museum in Germany and appeared to fit Stromer's description. Uhen based his assignment of his own North American genus (see below) to Eocetus on the similarities to Stromer's vertebrae.

Previously-assigned specimens and taxa
 described a new species, Eocetus wardii, from the late Lutetian (~42 Ma) of North Carolina based on more complete material: a partial skull, a few thoracic, lumbar and caudal vertebrae, ribs and an innominate fragment. Uhen initially argued that the innominate would have been sufficiently large to support a weight-bearing hind limb – suggesting the animal was a protocetid, a group of more primitive archaeocetes – but also has anatomical features in common with basilosaurids – more derived and fully aquatic archaeocetes. Uhen also noted that the composition of the ribs and vertebrae is different from that of other archaeocetes and sirenians: a core of light trabecular bone is surrounded by layers of dense cortical bone. Due to this mosaic of protocetid and basilosaurid features,  regarded Uhen's specimen as unique among North American archaeocetes and an interesting find, but questioned the validity of Uhen's attribution (including that of Stromer's two vertebrae).

 described another partial lumbar vertebra discovered in Rohrdorf, Bavaria, Germany, in 2003. They attributed it to Eocetus sp. – the first confirmed protocetid from Europe – and argued that this specimen further supports the hypothesis that protocetids were aquatic to the extent that they managed to spread over the world.

 described a still unnamed Bartonian protocetid from Peru based on the posterior portion of a skull, seven partial vertebrae, and ribs from and adult individual. Uhen et al. considered this specimen closely related to Eocetus based on vertebral morphology.

 described two vertebra, a thoracic and a lumbar, from a subadult individual found in Ukraine. They considered them comparable to those Uhen described in 1999 and attributed their specimen to "E." wardii.

References

Notes

Sources

 
 
 
 
 
  
 
  (PDF)
 
 
 
 
 
 

Eocene mammals of Africa
Protocetidae
Fossil taxa described in 1904
Prehistoric cetacean genera